The 2016–17 Championnat National season was the 19th season since its establishment. The fixtures were announced on 15 July 2016.

Teams

There are 18 clubs in the league, with four promoted teams from Championnat de France Amateur replacing the four teams that were relegated from National following the 2015–16 season. All clubs that secured National status for the season were subject to approval by the DNCG before becoming eligible to participate.

Team changes 
As of 14 July 2016, the following teams have mathematically achieved qualification for the 2016–17 season. Evian Thonon Gaillard, who were relegated from Ligue 2, was sent administratively to CFA due to financial troubles. As a result, Épinal were added back to National.

To National
Promoted from CFA
  Quevilly-Rouen
  Lyon-Duchère
  Pau
  Concarneau
Relegated from Ligue 2
 Paris FC
 Créteil

From National
Relegated to CFA
 Fréjus Saint-Raphaël
Relegated to 6th tier
 Luçon
 Colmar
Promoted to Ligue 2
 Strasbourg
 Orléans
 Amiens

Stadia and locations

League table

Play-offs
The 2016–17 season saw the return of a relegation play-off between the 18th-placed Ligue 2 team and the 3rd-placed team in the Championnat National in a two-legged confrontation. The Championnat National team hosted the first game.

Orléans won 2–0 on aggregate.

Top scorers

References

Championnat National seasons
3
France